Dell's Studio brand was a range of laptops and desktops targeted at the mainstream consumer market. The computers sit above Dell's Inspiron and below the XPS consumer lines in terms of price and specifications. They differ from Dell's lower-end Inspiron models by offering slot-loading optical drives, media keys, more cover design options, faster processor options, HDMI and eSATA ports, LED-backlit screens and backlit keyboards.

At launch, the Studio was offered in three models: the Studio 15 and the Studio 17, named after their respective screen size in inches, and the Studio Hybrid, named for its usage of laptop components in the form of an ultra-small form factor desktop. If purchased online, many customizable colors, designs, and features were available, including a fingerprint scanner in some countries.

On July 29, 2008, Dell introduced the desktop counterpart to the Dell Studio Laptops, the Dell Studio Hybrid PC. A compact desktop legacy-free PC using laptop components, it contained the same slot-loading optical drive as the laptops with the range of connectivity (e.g., number of USB ports) expected of a desktop PC.

On September 24, 2009, Dell released Studio laptops with the option for a mobile Core i7 processor, although Pentium Dual-Core and Core 2 Duo options were also available as lower-end options.

On June 18, 2010, Dell's website stopped selling the Studio Hybrid.

As of May 2011, Dell has discontinued the Studio line of notebooks.

Laptops

Studio 14
A 14" laptop.

Studio 1450: Uses Intel Pentium and Core 2 Duo processors, DDR3 memory and standard Intel GMA X4500MHD integrated graphics.
Studio 1457: Uses Intel Core i7 quad-core processors, DDR3 memory and standard ATI Mobility Radeon HD 4530 graphics.
Studio 1458: Uses Intel Core i3/i5/i7 quad-core and dual-core processors, DDR3 memory and standard Intel HD Graphics or ATI Mobility Radeon HD 4530 or 5450.

Studio 14z
A thin-and-light 14" laptop. Lacks an optical drive.

Intel Pentium T4200 (2.0 GHz/800 MHz FSB/1 MB cache)
Intel Core 2 T6400 (2.0 GHz/800 MHz FSB/2 MB cache)
Intel Core 2 P8600 (2.4 GHz/1066 MHz FSB/3 MB cache)
Intel Core 2 T9550 (2.66 GHz/1066 MHz FSB/6 MB cache)
Intel Core 2 T9900 (3.06 GHz/1066 MHz FBS/6 MB cache)
NVIDIA GeForce 9400M video card
Uses DDR3 memory

Studio 15
 
The Studio 15 is the mainstream model of the Studio laptop line. It has had many options and features that have changed over the years: processors ranging from low-end Pentium Dual Core processors up to quad-core i7 processors. Newly added was the ATI Mobility Radeon 5470 1 GB graphics card. Some models, like the Studio 1537, came in many different colors including, but not limited to orange, red, pink, lime green, black, and a range of artistic designs that would be part of the top of the computer and were not user-changeable. 

All models except the 1537, 1557, and 1569 shipped standard with Intel integrated graphics.
1530 series in general: The 1530 series came standard with touch capacitive media and eject buttons, a slot-loading DVD drive, and an optional fingerprint reader. Both the touch capacitive buttons, and the optional fingerprint reader were removed from later series. the fingerprint reader was replaced in later models with a facial recognition webcam, for those with the desire to log on without the need to type a password.
1535: Intel Pentium and Core 2 Duo processors, 800 MHz DDR2 RAM and the option of the ATI Mobility Radeon HD 3450 256 MB video card.
1536: AMD Turion X2 processors, 800 MHz DDR2 RAM and the option of the ATI Mobility Radeon HD 3450 video card.
1537: Offered various upgrades over the other 1530 models, including up to 4 GB of RAM from the factory(upgradable to 8 GB), faster Intel Core 2 Duo processor, a backlit keyboard, integrated Bluetooth, a dedicated ATI Mobility Radeon HD 34xx Series 256 MB video card and a 2-megapixel webcam with facial recognition.
1555: Newer Core 2 Duo and Pentium processors, 800 MHz DDR2 RAM and an ATI Mobility Radeon HD 4570 video card with 256 MB or 512 MB or dedicated memory.
1557: Intel Core i7 quad-core processor, 1066 MHz or 1333 MHz DDR3 RAM and standard ATI Mobility Radeon HD 4570 video card with 512 MB of video memory.
1558: Intel Core i3, i5 and i7 processors; 1066 MHz DDR3 RAM; and either an ATI Mobility Radeon HD 4570 video card with 512 MB of dedicated memory or a 5470 with 1 GB of dedicated memory.
1569: Intel Core i5-430M 2.26 GHz processor, 4 GB 1066 MHz DDR3 RAM and Intel integrated graphics or 512 MB ATI Mobility Radeon HD 4570 video card

Studio 17

A 17" laptop.

Studio 1735 (Intel Santa Rosa platform)
Studio 1736 (AMD Turion 64 processor)
Studio 1737 (Intel Montevina platform)
Studio 1745/47/49 (Intel Calpella (2009) platform featuring a Core i7 processor and DDR3 memory plus JBL 2.1 speakers [2 x 1.5 watt and 3 watt subwoofer])
Studio 17 Touch (featuring Windows 7 multi-touch on a capacitive display)

Studio XPS 13

A 13.3" laptop that offers a Studio-XPS crossover. Runs on DDR3 memory and uses Intel Core 2 Duo processors. When launched, the Studio XPS 13 was widely acclaimed as the ultimate notebook, offering an irresistible combination of technology, cutting-edge design, performance, and luxury style in the increasingly popular market for lighter notebooks. All of its attributes, and its wide success, made it all the more astonishing, if not suspicious, when Dell abruptly discontinued the Studio XPS 13 model, less than a year after its launch, leaving many would-be owners holding their credit cards, and many current owners on guard watching their prized possessions . The wait wasn't long. The latent technical problems, stemming from the notebook's relatively small shell packing a lot of sophisticated hardware, were numerous. Dell's designers simply attempted to pack too much power into the 13-inch model. In the arena of the lightweight notebooks, even one inch can make a difference, so sacrifices must be made. Among the widely reported issues is the overheating in the area of the vent and the video card, whereby the heat spreads to the palm rests and the bottom of the screen. The more serious issue is with the slot-loading optical drive; the device simply does not fit properly into the 13-inch shell. Yet as a result of the model's abrupt discontinuance, users who were in the market for a lightweight Studio XPS 13 model are left with few alternatives, if any. In fact, the only suitable replacement was the Studio XPS 16.

Studio XPS 16
A larger version of the Studio XPS 13 (16"). It offers an optional Blu-ray optical drive, and has an RGBLED 1080p full HD display (1920×1080), which was widely considered the best display on any laptop in the market. It was available with an Intel Core i7 CPU with two options for video cards, both having 1 GB of video memory: an ATI Mobility Radeon HD 4670 or a 5730.

Desktops

Studio Hybrid
A miniature desktop similar to the HP Pavilion Slimline series of desktops and Apple's Mac Mini. It is Dell's most energy-efficient desktop. The desktop is named Studio Hybrid because it uses Intel processors made for laptops as well as a laptop motherboard, memory and a laptop power adapter. The computer itself is enclosed in a plastic interchangeable sleeve which was available in various colors including a $130 premium version made out of bamboo. The machine was based on either a Pentium Dual Core or a Core 2 Duo mobile processor. By default it came with a slot-loading DVD-RW drive but for around $200 your system could be upgraded to a Blu-Ray drive that could also burn DVDs along with the Broadcom Crystal HD card needed to accelerate the video properly (Using Dell Media Direct Software). The board had an integrated Intel X3100 graphics chipset, so while not able to play serious video games, it could be fine for common tasks. When these computers were released in 2008 they initially came with Windows Vista but users were offered the Windows 7 upgrade at no extra cost from Microsoft. The last units to be sold came with Windows 7, but with the maximum ram upgrade of 4gb, could easily run Windows 8 or Windows 10 without a problem. The included stand could be configured to stand up the computer either vertically or horizontally. The appropriate "Hybrid" logo would light up depending on how the machine is orientated.

Studio and Studio Slim
Using the same case style as Dell's Inspiron 530 and 530s desktops but with a black color, the Studio and Studio Slim desktops are targeted towards consumers looking for a multimedia entertainment desktop.

Studio XPS Desktop
Combining the Studio's design with the performance of the XPS, the Studio XPS desktop is a full-fledged multimedia center.

Studio One 1909 (Studio One 19)
Released on April 28, 2009 in the United States, the Studio One 19 is a 19-inch all-in-one desktop computer. It is a lower-end alternative to Dell's XPS One 20 and 24. The chassis design is highly reminiscent of Dell's SX2210 21.5 in LCD monitor. The chassis can be customized with five different colors. There is also a touch-screen option.

Specifications

Issues

The Studio 15 (older 1535, 1536 and 1537 models) and 17 (1735, 1736 and 1737 models) suffer from problems with the touch sensitive controls where either the eject button or start button for Dell MediaDirect would stay lit for a few minutes after the unit was powered on, rendering the rest of the buttons useless.

Some users have reported video card problems with the Studio 1555 and Studio 1557, later found to be a faulty driver. Other issues with these models include overheating due to the hard-to-maintain heatsink and fan design, which is located in such a way that a general computer user is unable to access the heatsink and fan for cleaning or other maintenance.

The 1557 and 1558 models were known to have problems with overheating, which was generally linked to 3D gaming or other applications involving 3D graphics. The 1557 and 1558 were affected by hard-to-maintain components, which made it hard to clean out blocked heatsink vents or to clean and replace thermal paste due to the combined fan and heatsink design.

There are also several reports of 1557 models freezing up during booting, or having inaccessible hard drives. No clear cause or fix has been put forward by Dell, but it is also likely linked to overheating related to the built-in video card, or software-hardware malfunction related to the built-in ST Microelectronics accelerometer, which is supposed to protect the hard drive in case the laptop is dropped.

See also
 Mac Mini
 ASUS Eee Box
 Acer Aspire Revolution
 MSI Wind PC
 Splashtop, Nettop

References

External links

Studio Laptops at Dell.com
Studio Hybrid at Dell.com

Media
Dell Studio Hybrid Desktop, A HotHardware Video Spotlight (HotHardware)
Dell's Impressive Studio Hybrid PC

Studio
Discontinued products
All-in-one desktop computers